The 1951 Wichita Shockers football team was an American football team that represented Wichita University (now known as Wichita State University) as a member of the Missouri Valley Conference during the 1951 college football season. In its first season under head coach Robert S. Carlson, the team compiled a 2–7 record (2–4 against conference opponents), tied for fifth place out of seven teams in the MVC, and was outscored by a total of 200 to 74. The team played its home games at Veterans Field, now known as Cessna Stadium.

Schedule

References

Wichita
Wichita State Shockers football seasons
Wichita Shockers football